Lužac is a village in the municipality of Berane, Montenegro. It is located just outside the town of Berane.

Demographics
According to the 2011 census, its population was 983.

References

Populated places in Berane Municipality
Serb communities in Montenegro